The Ông Đốc River is a river of Vietnam. It flows through Cà Mau Province for 58 kilometres and empties into the Gulf of Thailand.

Rivers of Cà Mau province
Rivers of Vietnam